Business Aviation Corporation (Pty) Ltd and Another v Rand Airport Holdings (Pty) Ltd, an important case in the South African law of lease, dealt with the lessee's entitlement in respect of improvement of leased property. The issue was whether Article 10 of the Rental Housing Act (RHA) applied: Specifically, did it apply in respect of urban and rural property?

The Supreme Court of Appeal held that the RHA applies only to rural tenements; therefore, it was a question of use.

See also 
 South African law of lease

References 
 Business Aviation Corporation (Pty) Ltd and Another v Rand Airport Holdings (Pty) Ltd 2006 (6) SA 605 (SCA).

2006 in South African law
2006 in case law
Supreme Court of Appeal of South Africa cases